Tommy Graham is a singer and record producer from Toronto, Ontario, Canada.

Career

Tommy Graham joined his first band in Scarborough, a Toronto suburb in 1958. Along with his good friend, Brian Massey, this band became the original “Regents”.  The Regents' lineup evolved as they gigged around Toronto for the next couple of years.  Singer Kay Taylor joined the band in 1961, and as Kay Taylor and the Regents they became the house band at the original Club Bluenote on Yonge Street.
During its time, this after-hours R&B club hosted many of 'name' R&B artists who were touring through Toronto and would gravitate to the Club Bluenote after their gigs. Club owner, Al Steiner, would always encourage them to get up and sing a couple of songs during the famous 'floor show” in the middle of the evening. With the Regents providing instrumental backup, artists such as Jimmy Reed, Maxine Brown, The Olympics, The Marathons, Jackie Shane, Johnny Nash, Dianne Brooks, Joe Dee, The Charmaines, Shirley Matthews, and others would perform, and at times magic was created. 

It was a special time in the R&B history of Yonge Street ... and Toronto. A historical Toronto plaque has been placed on the sidewalk by the City of Toronto, in front of the original front door of the Club Bluenote on Yonge Street near Gerrard Street.

After the Big Town Boys decided to call it quits in late 1968, Graham travelled on a cultural journey for a year and a half in southern Asia, visiting and exploring parts of  India, West Pakistan and Afghanistan.  In India, he took in the music cultures and even studied for a time at the Akbar school of music in Calcutta. 

On returning to Toronto, he began working for producer Brian Ahern, contributing as a musician on Anne Murray's hit Snowbird and some other needed parts on during Murray's first four LPs.

Paul White, executive producer at Capital records, gave Graham the opportunity to record his first album titled “Planet Earth” in 1972. Some of the singles released from this album appeared on the Canadian charts at the time along with the cover version of Neil Young's, “After the Gold Rush” which charted in North America and Europe.

During 1980, he co-founded and created a unique computer graphics company based in Toronto, Canada. Ariel Computer Productions pioneered a new process for graphic designers to create and then output at super hi resolution quality. These images created were then transferred from the graphics work stations and imaged to film at up to 8000 lines of resolution.

In the 1990s, Graham resumed his career in music recording and production full-time. An initial project, involved going deep into the rainforest of Trinidad and Tobago, carrying a high end digital recorder.  Nature sounds and environs were recorded during various times of the day and night.

Original easy-listening music was integrated with instruments and flavours from the Caribbean, in two CDs, “Sounds of Tobago” and “More sounds of Trinidad and Tobago”

Two CDs were also produced for Brent Titcomb and his music.

Another project involved taking a portable multi track, recorder to South America,  recording  certain indigenous groups in their environments as well as recordings with more refined contemporary groups  during his time in Ecuador, Colombia, and Argentina.

In recent years Graham has been working with Roger Gibbs, originally from Barbados, currently living in Toronto. They have recorded and produced two CDs with the group Shak Shak as well as various Roger Gibbs recordings including the song "Toronto Carnival" featured at Caribana time in Toronto.

Discography

Albums

Singles

1975
"Here I Go Crying Again"/"Two Fisted Patriot Man"
Beverly Hills Records # 45-9366
7" - 45 RPM Single (Recorded live at the Custer County Fair)
Matrix (Monarch Pressing) 85057/8

Collaborations

with the Big Town Boys (aka BTB4)
 1965 Put You Down (Capitol) [#14 CAN]
 1965 It Was I (Capitol) [#5 CAN]
 1965 I Love Her So (Capitol)
 1966 Hey Girl Go It Alone (Capitol) [#7 CAN]
 1966 My Babe (Capitol)
 1967 Do It To 'Em (Yorkville)
 1967 Jack Rabbit (Yorkville)

References

Year of birth missing (living people)
Place of birth missing (living people)
Living people
Canadian country singers
Canadian male singers
Canadian record producers
Musicians from Toronto